The 2017–18 season was the Manitoba Junior Hockey League's (MJHL) 101st year of operation.  The Steinbach Pistons finished with best regular season record for the second consecutive year and defeated the Virden Oil Capitals to win their second Turnbull Cup.

Season notes
The annual Showcase takes place at the MTS Iceplex December 10–11, 2017. 
The MJHL and SJHL hold a joint showcase in Regina, Saskatchewan January 15–16, 2018.
The league announces the annual Prospects Development Camp takes place in Winnipeg July 26–29, 2018.  A U.S. Prospects Camp is held in Grand Forks, North Dakota in May 2018.
The MJHL announces that the Lyndon Lorne Memorial Trophy will be retired and replaced by the Frank McKinnon Memorial Trophy.
The league reduces the number of 20-year old players each team can play in a game from nine to eight.
Steinbach Pistons head coach Paul Dyck registers his 250th MJHL win as a coach in his 376th game, the fastest to reach that milestone in league history.
The MJHL delays the second game of the Turnbull Cup finals by four days in response to the Humboldt Broncos bus crash in Saskatchewan on April 6, 2018.  The Steinbach Pistons defeat the Virden Oil Capitals 4-games-to-2 to win their second league championship.
The ANAVET Cup is re-instated after Hockey Canada and the Canadian Junior Hockey League discontinue the Western Canada Cup.  The Steinbach Pistons defeat the Nipawin Hawks 4-games-to-2 to win the ANAVET Cup.
2018 NHL Entry Draft:  Steinbach Pistons goaltender Matthew Thiessen is selected in 7th round, 192nd pick overall by the Vancouver Canucks.

Standings

Playoffs

Post MJHL playoffs
ANAVET Cup
Steinbach Pistons defeated Nipawin Hawks 4-games-to-2
2018 Royal Bank Cup
Steinbach Pistons finish fifth in the round robin and are eliminated from playoffs.

League awards 
 Steve "Boomer" Hawrysh Award (MVP): Dexter Kuczek, Winnipeg
 MJHL Top Goaltender Award: Troy Martyniuk, Winkler
 Brian Kozak Award (Top Defenceman): Darby Gula, Steinbach
 Vince Leah Trophy (Rookie of the Year): Justin Lee, Virden
 Frank McKinnon Memorial Trophy (Hockey Ability and Sportsmanship): Drew Worrad, Steinbach
 Muzz McPherson Award (Coach of the Year): Paul Dyck, Steinbach
 Mike Ridley Trophy (Scoring Champion): Dexter Kuczek, Winnipeg
 MJHL Playoff MVP: Drew Worrad, Steinbach

See also
ANAVET Cup
2018 Royal Bank Cup

References

External links
 MJHL Website
 2017-18 MJHL season at HockeyDB.com

Manitoba Junior Hockey League seasons
MJHL